Somerset is an unincorporated community in Lincoln County, Nebraska, United States.

History
A post office was established at Somerset in 1887, and remained in operation until it was discontinued in 1944. The community was likely named after the town of Somerset, Massachusetts.

References

Unincorporated communities in Lincoln County, Nebraska
Unincorporated communities in Nebraska